Strong artificial intelligence may refer to:
    
"Strong Artificial Intelligence (AI) is an artificial intelligence that constructs mental abilities, thought processes, and functions that are impersonated from the human brain. It is more of a philosophical rather than practical approach."

Computer science 
 Artificial general intelligence: a hypothetical machine with the ability to apply intelligence to any problem, rather than just one specific problem. 
 Human-level intelligence: a hypothetical machine with a similar intelligence to an average human being.
 Superintelligence: a hypothetical machine with a vastly superior intelligence to the average human being.
 Artificial consciousness: a hypothetical machine that has subjective conscious experience, sentience and mind.

Philosophy 
 The strong AI hypothesis: the philosophical position that a computer program that causes a machine to behave exactly like a human being would also give the machine subjective conscious experience and a mind, in exactly the same sense that human beings have minds. (Also known as Functionalism (philosophy) or the Computational theory of mind).

See also
 Weak artificial Intelligence, which is intelligent only in a limited task specific field
 Artificial general intelligence